Joshua Anthony Vickers (born 1 December 1995) is an English footballer who plays as a goalkeeper for EFL Championship club Rotherham United. Vickers was on the books of Arsenal and Swansea City without playing first-team football for either, and made his Football League debut while on loan at Barnet.

Career
Vickers began his career at Arsenal's Academy. As a second-year scholar, he joined Isthmian League side Canvey Island on loan in August 2013 where he played 30 league games. before returning to the Gunners and signing a professional contract. Vickers then joined Concord Rangers, of the Conference South, on a one-month loan in November 2014, which was later extended until the end of the 2014–15 season. In August 2015, Vickers signed for Swansea City on a two-year deal. He joined Barnet on a season-long loan in July 2016, and made his English Football League debut when he started against Cambridge United on 6 August 2016.

He was released by Swansea at the end of the 2016–17 season.
Following his release, Vickers joined League Two club Lincoln City on a two-year deal. On 28 May 2020, it was announced Vickers would leave the club at the end of his current contract.

On 6 November 2020, Vickers signed for Rotherham United on a deal until the end of the season.

Career statistics

Honours

Club
Rotherham United
League One runner-up: 2021–22

Lincoln City
League Two: 2018–19
EFL Trophy: 2017–18

References

External links

1995 births
Living people
People from Brentwood, Essex
English footballers
Association football goalkeepers
Arsenal F.C. players
Canvey Island F.C. players
Concord Rangers F.C. players
Swansea City A.F.C. players
Barnet F.C. players
Lincoln City F.C. players
English Football League players
National League (English football) players
Isthmian League players